Anna Aleksandrovna Sablina (née Subareva; ; born 22 February 1945) is a retired Russian speed skater. She competed at the 1968 Winter Olympics in the 3000 m and finished in eighth place. 

Personal bests: 
500 m – 45.99 (1975)
1000 m – 1:32.2 (1973)
1500 m – 2:17.25 (1975)
 3000 m – 4:52.52 (1973)

References

External links
 
 
 

1945 births
Living people
Russian female speed skaters
Soviet female speed skaters
Olympic speed skaters of the Soviet Union
Speed skaters at the 1968 Winter Olympics